Patrick Smith, known professionally  as J.Que, is an American Grammy nominated record producer and songwriter. He has contributed to songs from Usher, Britney Spears, Jennifer Lopez, Beyoncé, Fantasia Barrino, Ciara, Avant, Chris Brown, Ariana Grande, The Gospellers, and Omarion.

Biography

Born in North Carolina he was raised in Anniston, Alabama. Smith has a son (Channing) and a daughter (Riley) with his wife Vivian.

Songs produced, written, or vocal-arranged

Awards
Smith has had 3 Grammy Nominations, 4 BET Award Noms, & 6 BMI Award

References

External links
 Info Site

African-American songwriters
Living people
People from North Carolina
Place of birth missing (living people)
Year of birth missing (living people)
People from Anniston, Alabama
21st-century African-American people